Kwakwa may refer to:

People
 Enock Kwakwa (born 1994), Ghanaian football player
 Eric Kwakwa (born 1994), Ghanaian football player
 Victoria Kwakwa, Ghanaian economist

Places
 
 QwaQwa, South Africa